Roncatto is a surname. Notable people with the surname include:

Evandro Roncatto (born 1986), Brazilian footballer
Gabrielle Roncatto (born 1998), Brazilian swimmer